Onehunga High School is a state co-educational secondary school in the Auckland suburb of Onehunga, New Zealand.

The school incorporates a business school, founded by Just Water International's creator Tony Falkenstein, which is sponsored by brewery company Lion Nathan and a construction school sponsored by Fletcher Construction, making it unique among New Zealand secondary schools.

The school attracts students from the suburbs of Onehunga, Māngere Bridge, Hillsborough, and Royal Oak and accepts a limited number of students from outside its zone.

History

Onehunga High School was "founded" in 1959 by Mr J. C. McCarthy on its Pleasant Street site. At its birth the roll was 190 students but it has grown slowly to a peak of over 1,500. McCarthy was principal from the foundation until his retirement 19 years later.

Onehunga is situated in one of Auckland's suburbs' overlooking the Manukau Harbour. Many Onehunga High School families have long histories in the area and a large number of the students are second or even third generation students. The school's proximity to Onehunga and Penrose's industrial and retail area has allowed links with some service clubs and businesses  including scholarships and trust funds.

In the early days the school was a mono-cultural in character, but during the 1980s it began to develop into a truly multi-cultural school, with increasing numbers of Māori, Polynesian and Asian students. Today the school is strongly international and enjoys all the qualities a wide range of cultures bring.

In the 1980s as part of a wider decentralisation changes in the New Zealand education system, school was allowed self-governance under a board of trustees system. From 2000, the school began a modernisation and development programme.

The school has always received students from Onehunga, Royal Oak, Hillsborough and Māngere Bridge but in recent times enrolments beyond this zone have increased. Currently approximately 50% of Onehunga High School come from out of zone areas as the school's reputation has attracted many new students.

Academics
According to the 2009 Education Review Office report, the overall NCEA Level 1 results showed "consistent improvement over the past three years. Since the school's involvement in the Ministry of Education numeracy project in 2006" and "achievement in Level 1 numeracy has also shown steady improvement".

Other results cited in the report by the school for 2008 include the highest success rates for the school since the inception of NCEA in meeting literacy and numeracy requirements at Level 1 and its best NCEA Levels 1 and 2 results. Noted also was the significant improvement in Level 2 NCEA results, which exceed decile averages and merit and excellence endorsements at Levels 2 and 3, which met or were above national averages. Nine NZQA scholarships were achieved in a range of subjects.

Academic divisions
In addition to the normal academic departments by learning areas, Onehunga High School has the following internal divisions at the Pleasant St campus:
The Business School
The Construction School
The Services Academy

Onehunga High Business School

The Business school, founded in 2002 has attracted significant amounts of media publicity in particular, and visits from many notable people including the Rt Hon Helen Clark (New Zealand Prime Minister at the time) and Rt Hon John Key (Leader of the Opposition). The Business School is aimed at better recognition for business standards into the National Curriculum.

Onehunga High Construction School
The Building and Construction School is a vocational division which provides opportunities for students to explore their interests in this trade.

Onehunga High Services Academy
The Services Academy is a unit focusing on preparing students who are looking for a future career in the New Zealand Defence Force or police.

Principals
 Con McCarthy 1959-1978
 Ken Prebble 1978-1990
 Chris Saunders 1990-2007
 Deidre Shea 2007–2022

Student life

Music And Performing Arts
Students are encouraged to participate in performing arts activities. The school has several performing arts groups which perform regularly at school and community functions. All "Year 9" students are offered instrumental (guitar, drums, trumpet) or voice tuition. Talent shows are held regularly which provide an opportunity for young performers to display their talents.

"Stage Challenge" involves up to 150 students in a student-directed and choreographed dance and drama spectacular.

Each year, until 2009, one Onehunga High School student wins a scholarship (provided by Tony Falkenstein) to attend the Cazadero Performing Arts Camp in California, US. In 2010, the scholarship was altered and now it sends two OHS students to Geelong Music Camp in Australia.

"Bring It On" involves up to 100 students in a student-choreographed hip hop-based dance. Onehunga High School placed 1st in the 2010 Bring It On Grand Final and 2nd in 2009.

OHS Sports
Onehunga High School offers a wide range of sports and has had success during its school history. Their Premier Boys Basketball team and 1st XV Boys Rugby Team are currently competing in Auckland's Premier Grades Respectively. They have collected many Auckland Titles through their sports teams and have also won National honors in Softball (2002) and most recently have become the 2012 1st XV Co-ed national champions stating their place as the best Co-Ed rugby school in NZ.

Robotics
Onehunga High School recently adopted Vex robotics as an extracurricular programme, enabling students to spend lunchtimes and weekends designing, building and programming their own robots. The school's teams have been extremely successful, winning 7 out of 9 competitions up until the New Zealand National competition. At the New Zealand Nationals, the senior team won the team Excellence Award, enabling the team to fly to Dallas, Texas and compete in the Vex Robotics World Championships.

2012 Has seen Onehunga High School become world champions at the Vex Robotics Championships. The championship held this year in Los Angeles – involved more than 10,000 intermediate, high school and university students, teachers and mentors from 20 countries who competed and won at regional and national contests to qualify for the world championships. Onehunga as well as winning overall also took the top prize as Engineering Division Champions.

Notable alumni

 Alan Dale - Actor
 Kahn Fotuali'i - Rugby (Tasman, Canterbury Crusader, Samoan International)
 Clayton Friend - Rugby League - Kiwi International, NRL - (North Sydney Bears)
 Shea Ili - Basketball (New Zealand Breakers)
 Stacey Ili - Rugby (Auckland, Connacht)
 Bubba Lau'ese - Rugby & Basketball (Samoa Rugby & Southland Sharks)
 Andrew Makalio - Rugby (Tasman, Crusaders) 
 Sililo Martens - Rugby (Nz School Boys, Tongan International)
 Bailey Mes - Netball (Northern Mystics & Silver Fern)
 Taniela Moa - Rugby (Auckland Blues, Waikato Chief and Tongan International)
 Isa Nacewa - Rugby (Auckland Blues & Fijian International)
 Ramesh Patel - NZ Hockey player & Gold Medalist at 1976 Montreal Olympic games
 Junior Pelesasa - Rugby (Australian School Boys, Queensland Reds, Australian International)
 James Pickering - Rugby League - NRL(Canterbury Bulldogs, Sydney Roosters, Fiji International)
 Madeleine Sami - Actor, Comedian & Singer
 Taleni Seu - Rugby (Auckland, Chiefs)
 Jimmy Thunder - Boxer (IBO, OPBF, WBC, IBF, Pan Pacific, Australian & WBC Continental Americas Heavyweight Titles)
 Munokoa Tunupopo, Cricket (Auckland and New Zealand)
 Samiu Vahafolau -  Rugby (Nz U19 & 21 player of the year, Otago Highlander, Tongan International)
 Sue Wood - Politician (First woman president of the National Party from 1982 to 1986)

 Groups
 Purest Form - R&B Singing Group (Rainbows End Theme Song)
 SWIDT - Rap Group

References

External links
Onehunga High School

Educational institutions established in 1959
Secondary schools in Auckland
1959 establishments in New Zealand